James Freeburn Fleming (7 January 1929 – August 2019) was a Scottish professional footballer, who played as a full back.

Career
Born in Glasgow, Fleming played for Tollcross Cydale, Stirling Albion, Workington and Berwick Rangers. He became a plumber after his retirement from playing football.

Fleming died in Rutherglen in August 2019, at the age of 90.

References

1929 births
2019 deaths
Scottish footballers
Stirling Albion F.C. players
Workington A.F.C. players
Berwick Rangers F.C. players
Scottish Football League players
English Football League players
Association football fullbacks
Date of death missing
British plumbers